Executive actions of the CIA are directives issued to the Central Intelligence Agency of the United States.

History 
The CIA was created under the National Security Act of 1947, which Harry S. Truman signed on July 26, 1947. Richard Bissell was in charge of Directorate for plans to contain Communism around the world. These operations were called "Black Operations", later known as Executive Actions. It refers to assassination operations. Executive Actions get their power from Article II of the Constitution. Here are different edicts giving power to the president; presidential proclamations to presidential directives. The main ones are executive orders and presidential memoranda. Executive orders have the most power. "It's a document that orders the executive branch officials to do something" A memorandum is a "proposal to persuade", and the president uses these for a more general scope of policy. Executive orders must by law be published in the Federal Register.

Assassination orders 
Political leaders deposed as a result of 'executive action' include:

 Patrice Lumumba of the Congo
 the Dominican Republic dictator Rafael Trujillo
 General Abd al-Karim Kassem of Iraq
 Ngo Dinh Diem, the leader of South Vietnam.

In March 1960, President Dwight Eisenhower of the United States approved a CIA plan to overthrow Fidel Castro who had established a socialist government in Cuba.

The CIA started to use drone strikes for targeted killing under President George W. Bush in 2001, during the War on Terror. It lost authority to do so by order of President Barack Obama, but regained it again under President Donald Trump.

Executive Order 11905 
The Ford administration forbade assassination in 1976 with Executive Order 11905. Since this ruling was one of at least four preceding the U.S. invasion of Panama, some who saw the ruling as giving a green light (approval) for Manuel Noriega to be killed "accidentally". Noriega survived the invasion, and surrendered to US forces.

See also 
Human rights violations by the CIA#Assassinations
Targeted killings
Disposition Matrix
Phoenix Program

References

Homicide
Central Intelligence Agency operations